West Germany (performing under the banner Germany) was present at the Eurovision Song Contest 1989, held in Lausanne, Switzerland. This year marked the last Contest in which participation and televoting were only open to residents of West Germany. The winning entry was "Flieger", performed by Nino de Angelo and composed by Dieter Bohlen with lyrics by Joachim Horn-Bernges.

Before Eurovision

Ein Lied für Lausanne 
The final, broadcast by Bayerischer Rundfunk to ARD broadcasters across West Germany, took place on 23 March 1989 at the Deutsches Theater in Munich, and was hosted by actor and comedian Hape Kerkeling. Ten acts presented their entries live and the winner was selected by public televoting through hotline.

At Eurovision 
Nino de Angelo performed twenty-first on the night of the contest, following Iceland and preceding Yugoslavia. At the close of the voting the song had received 46 points, placing 14th in a field of 22 competing countries. It marked the second appearance in a row in which Germany took the 14th place slot at the end of the night.

Voting

References

External links
German National Final 1989

1989
Countries in the Eurovision Song Contest 1989
Eurovision